Shashikman (Şaşıkman) is a rural locality (a selo) and the administrative centre of Shashikmanskoye Rural Settlement, Ongudaysky District, the Altai Republic, Russia. The population was 691 as of 2016. There are 8 streets.

Geography 
Shashikman is located 8 km northwest of Onguday (the district's administrative centre) by road. Onguday is the nearest rural locality.

References 

Rural localities in Ongudaysky District